Meall nan Eun (928 m) is a mountain in the Grampian Mountains of Scotland. It is located east of Glen Etive in Argyll and Bute.

A dome like mountain with a rounded top but steep sides, it has a summit plateau. Climbs usually start from Glen Etive and the peak is often climbed together with the nearby Munro Stob Coir'an Albannaich.

References

Marilyns of Scotland
Munros
Mountains and hills of Argyll and Bute